The First Battle of Kharkov, so named by Wilhelm Keitel, was the 1941 battle for the city of Kharkov, Ukrainian SSR, during the final phase of Operation Barbarossa between the German 6th Army of Army Group South and the Soviet Southwestern Front. The Soviet 38th Army was ordered to defend the city while its factories were dismantled for relocation farther east.

The German 6th Army needed to take the city in order to close the widening gap to the German  17th Army. By 20 October the Germans had reached the western edge of the city, it was taken by the 57th Infantry Division by 24 October. At that time, however, most of Kharkov's industrial equipment had been evacuated or rendered useless by the Soviet authorities.

Importance of Kharkov

Kharkov's railroad system
In the autumn of 1941, Kharkov was considered one of the Soviets' most important strategic bases for railroad and airline connections. It not only connected the east-west and north-south parts of Ukraine, but also several central regions of the USSR including the Crimea, the Caucasus, the Dnieper region, and Donbas.

Military importance
Kharkov was one of the largest industrial centers of the Soviet Union. One of its greatest contributions was the Soviet T-34 tank that was both designed and developed at the Kharkov Tractor Factory, considered the most productive tank plant in the country. Other factories in the city included the Kharkov Aircraft Plant, Kharkov Plant of the NKVD (FED), and the Kharkov Turbine Plant. The city's military industries also produced Su-2 aircraft, artillery tractors, 82 mm mortars, sub-machine guns, ammunition, and other materiel.
The main German objective was the railroads and military factories, so they desperately tried to keep the industrial area of Kharkov intact. Adolf Hitler himself stressed the importance of those military plants stating: "… The second in importance is south of Russia, particularly the Donets Basin, ranging from the Kharkov region. There is the whole basis of [the] Russian economy; if the area is mastered then it would inevitably lead to the collapse of the entire Russian[sic] economy…"

Population of Kharkov
Kharkov was one of the most populous Soviet cities, rated at 901,000 people on 1 May 1941. In September 1941 the population skyrocketed to 1.5 million people, swollen by evacuees from other cities. After years of deadly warfare, the population of Kharkov decreased to 180-190 thousand by the time of its recapture in August 1943.

Before the battle

The aftermath of Kiev

After the Battle of Kiev, the German Army high command (OKH) ordered Army Group Center to redeploy its forces for the attack on Moscow, and so the 2nd Panzer Group turned north towards Bryansk and Kursk. Army Group South, and in particular Walther von Reichenau's 6th Army and Carl-Heinrich von Stülpnagel's 17th Army took the place of the panzer divisions. The main offensive formation of Army Group South, Paul Ludwig Ewald von Kleist's 1st Panzer Group, was in the meantime ordered south for a drive to Rostov-on-Don and the Caucasian oilfields, following Führer Directive No. 35. The burden of processing Kiev's 600,000 Soviet prisoners of war fell upon the 6th and 17th Armies, so while the 1st Panzer Group secured the German victory in the battle of Melitopol, these two armies spent the next three weeks regrouping.

Stavka (Soviet High Command), needed to stabilize its southern flank and poured reinforcements into the area between Kursk and Rostov, at the expense of its forces in front of Moscow. The Southwestern Front, which had been destroyed during the battle of Kiev, was re-established under the command of Marshal Semyon Timoshenko, one of the more capable Red Army commanders. The 6th, 21st, 38th and 40th Armies were reconstituted almost from scratch.

Approaching Kharkov

With the Battle of Moscow under way, the Germans had to protect their flanks, and on 6 October von Reichenau advanced through Sumy and Okhtyrka in the direction of Belgorod and Kharkov. On the same day, the 17th Army commenced its offensive from Poltava towards Lozova and Izyum to protect the lengthening flank of the 1st Panzer Army (formerly the 1st Panzer Group). The Soviet 6th Army (Rodion Malinovsky) and 38th Army (Viktor Tsiganov) were beaten back in disarray. As the Battle of Moscow approached, the Soviet Red Army suffered a big defeat at Vyazma and Bryansk, with 700,000 casualties. The few reserves available were desperately needed to defend the Soviet capital, not the Southwestern Front. With no reserves to plug the breach, the Soviets were forced back to Voronezh to prevent the collapse of the southern flank.

The main objectives of the German Army before the fall of winter were to capture Leningrad, Moscow and the approaches to the Caucasian oilfields, but Kharkov was an important secondary objective. Besides the need to protect the flanks of its motorized spearheads, the Germans valued Kharkov as an industrial center and railroad hub. Capturing the city would push the Soviet Southwestern and Southern Front armies back on Voronezh and Stalingrad as their major transport hubs. The German offensive stalled in the second week of October due to the rasputitsa mud season and the poor logistics in the area between the Dnepr and the front: all road bridges had collapsed and ice threatened the pontoon replacements. Hitler allocated resources from the 17th Army to the 6th Army to ensure the capture of Kharkov. This, however, weakened the 17th Army's effort to protect the flank of the 1st Panzer Army and contributed to the German defeat at the Battle of Rostov. After 17 October, night frost improved the roads, but snow and cold started to hamper the autumn-equipped Germans, who had expected the entire Barbarossa invasion to be over before winter.

Course of the battle

Preparing to take the city
The task of assaulting Kharkov itself was given to the German LV. Armeekorps commanded by General der Infanterie Erwin Vierow. This corps had at its disposal the 101. Leichte-Division, commanded by Generalleutnant Josef Brauner von Haydringen and coming in from the north, the 57. Infanterie-Division, commanded by Generalmajor Anton Dostler and coming in from the south, and the 100. Leichte-Division, which did not take part in the battle. Sturmgeschütz-Abteilung 197, commanded by Hauptmann Kurt von Barisani had two of its three batteries attached to the 57. Infanterie-Division to provide close fire support during the assault.

For the defense of Kharkov, the Soviet 216th Rifle Division had been reformed there after its destruction at Kiev. It received little to no support because the 38th Army was in strategic retreat and planned to defend Kharkov only until its factory equipment had been evacuated.

Battles on the western edge of the city (20–23 October)

57th Infantry Division plus a Panzer Brigade

101st Light Division

By 21 October the 101st Light Division had reached a line about six kilometers west of Kharkov. The 228th Light Regiment spearheaded the division, its 1st and 3rd battalions taking up defensive positions on the front, with the 2nd battalion in reserve. On 22 October the regiment was ordered to conduct reconnaissance to determine the enemy's strength. That same day at noon the regiment was attacked by a Soviet infantry battalion supported by tanks. The attack was repulsed and two tanks were disabled. That night the recon information was transmitted by radio to the Division HQ. The 216th Rifle Division had occupied the western edge of the city, with machine gun nests, mortar pits and minefields in place.

For the attack, the 3rd battalion (the regiment's right flank), was reinforced with two guns from the division's artillery, The 85th Artillery Regiment, a company of engineers and an 88 mm anti-aircraft gun. The 2nd battalion received the same reinforcements, but without the AA gun. The 1st battalion acted as the regimental reserve. The first battalion of the 229th Light Regiment would protect the left flank of the 228th. The attack hour was set at noon, in conjunction with the 57th Infantry Division.

At 11:00 hours, a liaison was established between the 85th Artillery and the 228th Light Regiments. The artillery was not ready at the time designated, so the attack had to be postponed. In the meantime the anti-tank company, who had been stuck in the mud at the rear, finally arrived at the front and was ordered to assign one 37 mm AT-gun platoon to every frontline battalion. At 14:25, the artillery was ready and the attack hour was set at 15:00.

Assault on the city (23–24 October)
The evacuation of industrial enterprises started before the Germans arrived. By 20 October 1941 it was virtually completed. Three hundred and twenty trains were sent with the equipment from 70 major factories. Kharkov was taken by von Reichenau's 6th Army, on 24 October 1941.

Occupation of Kharkov

The city was subject to its first occupation during the war, which lasted until 16 February 1943. The city never became part of Reichskommissariat Ukraine because of its proximity to the front. The staff of the LV Army Corps acted as the occupational authority, using 57. ID as an occupation force. Generalmajor Anton Dostler was Stadtkommandant until 13 December, when he was succeeded by Generalleutnant Alfred von Puttkamer, and Kharkov was transferred to the Heeresgebiet of the 6th Armee and put under the joint authority of the Stadtkommandant and Field Command 757.

German troops acting under the authority of the Reichenau-Befehl of 10 October (effectively an order to kill anybody associated with communism) terrorized the population that was left after the battle. Many of the Soviet commanders' corpses were hung off balconies to strike fear into the remaining population. Many people began to flee, causing chaos.

In the early hours of 14 November, multiple buildings in the city center were blown up by time-fuses left by the retreating Red Army. Casualties included the commander (Generalleutnant Georg Braun) and staff of the 68th Infantry Division. The Germans arrested some 200 civilians (mostly Jews) and hanged them from the balconies of large buildings. Another 1,000 were taken as hostages and interned in the Hotel International on Dzerzhinsky Square. All of these war crimes were committed by frontline Wehrmacht commanders, not by SS troops.

On 14 December, the Stadtkommandant ordered the Jewish population to be concentrated in a hut settlement near the Kharkov Tractor Factory. In two days, 20,000 Jews were gathered there. Sonderkommando 4a, commanded by SS-Standartenführer Paul Blobel, of Einsatzgruppe C started shooting the first of them in December, then continuing to kill them throughout January in a gas van. This was a modified truck that fitted 50 people in it; the van drove around the city and slowly killed the people that were trapped in it with carbon monoxide that was emitted from the vehicle itself and channeled into an airtight compartment. The victims died by a combination of carbon monoxide poisoning and suffocation.

The German Army confiscated large quantities of food to be used by its troops, creating acute shortages in the Ukraine. By January 1942 around one-third of the city's 300,000 remaining inhabitants suffered from starvation. Many would die in the cold winter months.

As a result of the battles in Kharkov, the city was left in ruins. Dozens of architectural monuments were destroyed and numerous artistic treasures taken. One of the Soviet Unions's best known authors, Aleksey Nikolayevich Tolstoy wrote: "I saw Kharkiv. As if it were Rome in the 5th century. A huge cemetery…"

See also
 Second Battle of Kharkov
 Third Battle of Kharkov

Notes

References

Sources
 
 Glantz, David M. (2001). Before Stalingrad, Tempus Publishing Ltd. 
 Kharkov News
 Kiessling, Hannes (2007–2011). Bericht über die Einnahme von Charkow, 57.Infanterie-Division. Retrieved 14-08-2011
 Kirchubel, Robert (2003). Operation Barbarossa 1941: Army Group South, Praeger Publishers. 
 Margry, Karel (February 2001). "Kharkov", After The Battle, Issue 112, p. 3–45
 Memoir of Kharkov’s History
 Ukrainian Historical Journal

External links

Conflicts in 1941
1941 in the Soviet Union
Battles of Kharkov
Battles of World War II involving Germany
Battles involving the Soviet Union
Battles and operations of the Soviet–German War
Operation Barbarossa
October 1941 events